Stresa is a town and comune of about 4,600 residents on the shores of Lake Maggiore in the province of Verbano-Cusio-Ossola in the Piedmont region of northern Italy, about  northwest of Milan. It is situated on road and rail routes to the Simplon Pass.

History

The name of the town first appeared in documents on January 15, AD 998 as "STRIXSYA". Later "STREXIA", "STREXA", and "STRESIA" were also used..

In the 15th century, it grew into a fishing community and owed feudal allegiance to the House of Visconti of Milan. It subsequently came under the control of the Borromeo family. In 1948 American author and journalist Ernest Hemingway visited the town. He had set part of his 1929 novel Farewell to Arms in the Grand Hotel des Iles Borromees. In 2002, Stresa hosted the 10th International Hemingway Conference.

Stresa has played host to a number of political conferences in the 20th century, including in:
1935: the UK, Italy and France re-affirm the Treaty of Locarno and agree to form the Stresa front to combat and contain Nazi Germany.
1958: the foundations of what would become Europe's Common Agricultural Policy of the European Economic Community were formulated in Stresa.

Stresa is also the venue for the "Settimane Musicali"; an international classical music festival which is held annually in the summer.

Transport
Regular boat services from the town's two docks provide access to the nearby Borromean Islands. Until its May 2021 crash, the Stresa-Alpino-Mottarone Cable Car offered a 20-minute ride to the summit of Monte Mottarone, with the Giardino Botanico Alpinia en route. Eurocity services connect to Milano, Berne and Geneva.

Main sights

 Borromean Islands near Stresa are major points of interest and can be seen from Stresa. 
Villa Ducale, commissioned by Giacomo Filippo Bolongaro and dating from about 1770. In 1848 the villa passed to the Italian philosopher Antonio Rosmini-Serbati and today it houses the International Centre for Rosminian Studies.  
Villa 'Orto, built in 1900. It was commissioned by the painter Liberto Dell'Orto and designed by Boffi.  
 The large  Villa Pallavicino, between Stresa and Belgirate. It was the inspiration of Ruggero Bonghi in the 1850s and now is the site of a zoological park.
  Church of Saints Ambrogio and Theodul (restored in Neoclassical style by Giuseppe Zanoia in 1790)

Famous buildings of Stresa in movies
Villa Castelli, location of the black comedy Beati i ricchi (Blessed Are the Rich) (1972) by Salvatore Samperi, the TV movie horror Ho incontrato un'ombra (1974) by Daniele D'Anza, the thriller The Bishop's Bedroom (La stanza del vescovo) (1977) by Dino Risi and the drama La Sapienza (2014) by Eugène Green.
Hotel Regina Palace, location of Totò al giro d'Italia (1948) by Mario Mattoli, Miss Italia (1950) by Duilio Coletti, Grand Hotel Excelsior (1982) by Castellano & Pipolo.

(Information from the Dizionario del Turismo Cinematografico)

Stresa in fiction
 Good Blood by Aaron Elkins (2004), Berkley Prime Crime,

References

External links

Official site 
Visit Stresa – tourist information 

Populated places on Lake Maggiore
Stresa